Jorge Lanata (born 12 September 1960) is an Argentine journalist and author. He founded the newspaper Página 12. He hosts Lanata sin filtro on Radio Mitre and Periodismo para todos on El Trece. He writes a column in Clarín.

History
He was born in Mar del Plata. His grandfather was Agustín Lanata, a well known footballer of the second decade of the 20th century.

He started his career at 14 writing short news for Radio Nacional. Since 1977 he was a collaborator of several written media: Siete Días magazine, Clarín Revista. In 1983 he entered the news program of Radio Belgrano and made investigation reports for Sin Anestesia show, while collaborating with Humor, El Periodista and El Porteño magazines.

He was a founder of the Cooperativa de Periodistas that purchased the monthly magazine El Porteño, and was its editor in chief. In 1987 he founded Página 12 newspaper, and was its director until 1994. From 1990 until 1993 he hosted Hora 25 radio show, and between 1994 and 1996 Rompe/Cabezas (1995 Martín Fierro Award for best journalistic show in radio). He regularly published in media abroad (Miami Herald, El Espectador -Colombia-, among others).

He directed Veintitrés (Twenty-Three) magazine. He hosted Día D (D-day), a very popular TV show that achieved Martín Fierro award for best journalistic television show in 1996 and 1997, and Clarín Award for best TV show in 2003. Lanata himself achieved a Marín Fierro Award for Best Journalistic TV Host in 1996, 1997 and 2004.

He produced the documentary series BRIC: The New World in 2010, and In 2011 he produced the television series 26 personas para salvar al mundo, a series of interviews with 26 people whom he believes have the power to change the word.

Radio
In 2012 he started hosting "Lanata Sin Filtro" on Radio Mitre and, to this day, is one of the most popular radio shows in Argentina.

Periodismo Para Todos
In 2012 Lanata came back to TV with a new show called "Periodismo para todos". The 2013 edition worked with the case of the K money trail.

In December 2015 the Citizen's Lab, at the Munk School for Global Affairs, at University of Toronto, identified Lanata and several other South American opposition figures as having their cellphones targeted for extrajudicial surveillance by government associated hackers.

Books and literature
In 1987 he published El nuevo periodismo (The New Journalism) as a compiler, and the following year La guerra de las piedras (War of the Stones, report). He also published Polaroids (short stories, 1991), Historia de Teller (novel, 1992), Cortinas de Humo (Smokescreens, 1995, in collaboration with American journalist Joe Goldman), an investigation on the 1994 terrorist attack to the Argentine Israelite Mutual Association (AMIA), and Vuelta de página (Turn of the Page, 1997), a collection of press articles written throughout his whole journalistic career. One of his short stories, "Oculten la luna" ("Hide the Moon"), was included in Prospero's Mirror (Curbstone Press of united States). His books Argentinos 1 and Argentinos 2 sold more than 340.000 copies, and were edited in Spain in a single volume. In 2004 he published ADN, mapa genético de los defectos argentinos (DNA, Genetic Map of Argentine Faults, essay).

Films
In October 2004, he premiered Deuda (Debt), a documentary on foreign debt and his opera prima in cinema discussing bureaucratic corruption and ignorance.

Awards

 2013 Tato award as best journalist hosting
 2013 Martín Fierro Awards
 Best male journalist
 2015 Martín Fierro awards
 Golden Martín Fierro Award
 Best male journalist (for Periodismo para todos)

References

External links

1960 births
Living people
Argentine journalists
Male journalists
Argentine newspaper founders
Argentine magazine founders
Investigative journalists
People from Mar del Plata
Argentine male writers
Argentine television personalities
Argentine radio presenters
Argentine film directors
Golden Martín Fierro Award winners